"Where the Hood At?" is a song by American rapper DMX, released as the lead single from his 2003 studio album Grand Champ. AllMusic stated "The anthemic lead single, 'Where the Hood At,' is precisely modeled after previous DMX rallying calls like 'Ruff Ryder Anthem,' 'What's My Name?,' and 'Who We Be.'"

"Where the Hood At?" peaked at #68 on the Billboard Hot 100, and would become the last DMX song to chart on it with DMX as the lead artist, before his death in 2021.

Release

Production
The song was recorded in a studio in Chicago. DMX's close friend Kato was also there while DMX was recording it. When DMX first heard the beat, he immediately came up with the lyrics for what would later be the first line of the chorus for the song, which also became the title of the song.

The clean version does not have the third verse, unlike the explicit version. The producers for the song were the music creation team Tuneheadz. Recorded in 2003, it was one of the first singles to be available as a digital download via Amazon.com.

The song samples "I'll Play the Blues for You" by Albert King. That song was originally sampled by Big Daddy Kane for the song "Young, Gifted and Black". DMX stated that he was "in love with that beat when Kane did it".

Music video
The music video is clean and is set in DMX's neighborhood in Yonkers, New York. There are appearances from rappers Drag-On, Swizz Beatz, Fat Joe and Busta Rhymes. In the second half of the video, a song entitled "A'Yo Kato", produced by Swizz Beatz, was added to pay tribute to his fallen friend.

Track listing

US version
"Where the Hood At?"
"Where the Hood At?" (Instrumental)
"Ruff Ryders' Anthem"

UK version
"Where the Hood At?"
"Ruff Ryders' Anthem"
"Who We Be"
"Where the Hood At?" (Video CD-ROM)

Charts

Certifications

References

2003 singles
DMX (rapper) songs
Def Jam Recordings singles
Ruff Ryders Entertainment singles
Hip hop songs
Diss tracks
Gangsta rap songs
2003 songs
Songs written by DMX (rapper)